Nvichia is an extinct genus of ray-finned fish belonging to the family Stichaeidae, the pricklebacks and shannies. It’s only species Nvichia makushoki was found in Miocene deposits on Sakhalin.

References

Xiphisterinae
Prehistoric fish
Fish described in 1998